Antoine Charles Ernest Barthez (1811-1891) most well known as Dr. Barthez was a French physician.

Barthez produced three volumes on children's diseases with Frédéric Rilliet (1814-1861). He was influential in the study of child neurology.

He was the grandnephew of the distinguished physician Paul Joseph Barthez. Barthez worked as a physician at the court of Napoleon III and Eugénie de Montijo. In 1912, posthumous letters from Barthez were made public in a book translated by Bernard Miall. One letter caused controversy as it alleged that the medium Daniel Dunglas Home was caught using his foot to fake supposed spirit effects during a séance in Biarritz in 1857.

Publications

Treatise on the Pneumonia of Children (1841)
Traite clinique et pratique des maladies des enfants (3 volumes, 1843)
The Empress Eugénie and Her Circle (English edition by T. Fisher Unwin, 1912. Also published in New York: Brentano's, 1913).

References

1811 births
1891 deaths
French pediatricians